¿Quién es la máscara? (Spanish for Who is the Mask?) is a Mexican talent reality television series produced by Televisa and Endemol Shine Group. It is based on the South Korean television show King of Mask Singer created by Seo Chang-man. Televisa is the second network in the Americas to obtain the franchise of said program. It is hosted by Omar Chaparro. It premiered on Las Estrellas on August 25, 2019.

The series has been renewed for a fourth season, that premiered on October 16, 2022.

Format
A group of celebrities hide behind a character and, week after week, a panel of researchers will try to discover who is behind the mask. Competitors are matched in face-off competitions and perform a song. The studio audience votes for their favorite performance and the masked singer with the most votes is safe for the week, while the celebrity with the least votes is nominated for elimination. The panelists decide which of the nominated celebrities will not continue in the competition. The eliminated celebrity removes their mask to reveal their identity.

Panelists and host

The panelists of the first season consisted of actor and comedian Adrián Uribe, singer Yuri, actress and comedian Consuelo Duval, and singer Carlos Rivera. Adrián Uribe did not return for season two and was replaced by Juanpa Zurita. Consuelo Duval did not return for season three and was replaced by Mónica Huarte. Season 1 panelist Adrián Uribe replaced Chaparro as host in season 3. Mónica Huarte did not return for season four and was replaced by Galilea Montijo, while Omar Chaparro will return to the show as host replacing Adrián Uribe.

Series overview

Reception

Ratings 
  

| link2             = ¿Quién es la máscara? (Mexican season 2)
| episodes2         = 10
| start2            = 
| end2              = 
| startrating2      = 3.8
| endrating2        = 3.9
| viewers2          = |2}}  

| link3             = ¿Quién es la máscara? (Mexican season 3)
| episodes3         = 9
| start3            = 
| end3              = 
| startrating3      = 3.9
| endrating3        = 
| viewers3          = |2}}  

| link4             = ¿Quién es la máscara? (Mexican season 4)
| episodes4         = 9
| start4            = 
| end4              = 
| startrating4      = 3.1
| endrating4        = 
| viewers4          = |2}}  
}}

Awards and nominations

Specials

¿Quién es la máscara? Teletón 2019
On December 14, 2019, as part of Teletón 2019, a special program was held where Diego Boneta, Patricia Manterola, Eugenio Derbez and Cristián de la Fuente formed the judging panel. The show was hosted by Galilea Montijo. The program consisted of only three face-offs between four contestants wearing first season costumes.

¿Quién es la máscara? Teletón 2020
On December 5, 2020, as part of Teletón 2020, a special program was held where Mario Bautista, Consuelo Duval, Juanpa Zurita, and Carlos Rivera formed the judging panel. The show was hosted by Yuri. The program consisted of only two face-offs between three contestants wearing season two costumes.

¿Quién es la máscara? Teletón 2021
On December 4, 2021, as part of Teletón 2021, a special program was held where Mónica Huarte, Juanpa Zurita, and Carlos Rivera formed the judging panel. The show was hosted by Adrián Uribe. The program consisted of only two face-offs between three contestants wearing season three costumes.

¿Quién es la máscara? Teletón 2022
A fourth Teletón special program was held on December 17, 2022. Galilea Montijo, Carlos Rivera, and Juanpa Zurita formed the judging panel. The show was hosted by Omar Chaparro. The program consisted of only two face-offs between three contestants wearing season four costumes.

References

External links
 

2019 Mexican television series debuts
Las Estrellas original programming
Mexican reality television series
Spanish-language television shows
2010s Mexican television series
Mexican television series based on South Korean television series
Television series by Endemol